The 2011 Country Music Association Awards, 45th Annual Ceremony, is a music award ceremony that was held on November 9, 2011, at the Bridgestone Arena in Nashville, Tennessee. The ceremony was co-hosted for the fourth consecutive year by Brad Paisley and Carrie Underwood.

The night's top prize, entertainer of the year, went to Taylor Swift, which was her only victory of the evening; She became only the second female artist to ever win the honor twice, after Barbara Mandrell won it in 1980 and 1981.

Winners and nominees

Winners are shown in bold.

Hall of Fame

Performers

References 

Country Music Association
CMA
Country Music Association Awards
Country Music Association Awards
November 2011 events in the United States
2011 awards in the United States
21st century in Nashville, Tennessee
Events in Nashville, Tennessee